The 2019 NBA G League draft was the 19th draft of the National Basketball Association G League. The draft was held on October 26, 2019, just before the 2019–20 season. Anthony Lawrence II was selected with the first overall pick by the Northern Arizona Suns.

Key

Draft 
Source

First round

Other notable draftees

References 

Draft
National Basketball Association lists
NBA G League draft
NBA G League draft